Thomas David 'Toby' King (born 23 January 1970) was a Scottish footballer who played for Clydebank, Arbroath, Dumbarton, Clyde and Cowdenbeath.

References

1970 births
Scottish footballers
Dumbarton F.C. players
Clydebank F.C. (1965) players
Arbroath F.C. players
Clyde F.C. players
Cowdenbeath F.C. players
Scottish Football League players
Living people
Association football midfielders